was a member of the Japanese imperial family and the wife of Yasuhito, Prince Chichibu, the second son of Emperor Taishō and Empress Teimei. Setsuko was a sister-in-law of Emperor Shōwa and an aunt by marriage of Emperor Akihito.

Early life
Setsuko Matsudaira was born on 9 September 1909 in Walton-on-Thames, England, into the prominent Matsudaira family. Her father, Tsuneo Matsudaira, was a diplomat and politician who later served as the Japanese ambassador to the United States (1924) and later to Great Britain (1928), and still later, Imperial Household Minister (1936–45, 1946–47). Her mother, Nobuko Nabeshima, was a member of the Nabeshima family. Her paternal grandfather, Katamori Matsudaira, was the last daimyō of the Aizu Domain and head of the Aizu-Matsudaira cadet branch of the Tokugawa. Her maternal grandfather, Marquis Naohiro Nabeshima, was the former daimyō of the Saga Domain. Her mother's elder sister, Itsuko (1882–1976), married Prince Morimasa Nashimoto, an uncle of Empress Kōjun. Despite her prestigious heritage, Setsuko was technically born a commoner, but both sides of her family maintained kinship with distinguished kazoku aristocratic families close to the Japanese Imperial Family.

From 1925 to 1928, Setsuko was educated at the Sidwell Friends School in Washington, D.C. while her father was ambassador to the United States. Setsuko was fluent in English and was sometimes considered to be a Kikokushijo. Upon her return to Japan, Setsuko was chosen by Empress Teimei to marry her second son, Yasuhito, Prince Chichibu, despite the fact she was a commoner. Setsuko married the Prince after her uncle, Viscount Morio Matsudaira, formally adopted her, thus removing the status incongruity between the prince and his bride.

Marriage

On 28 September 1928, aged 19, Setsuko wed Prince Chichibu, and became Princess Chichibu. The bride and groom were eighth cousins, thrice removed, as both were descended from Nabeshima Katsushige, the first lord of Saga. Prince and Princess Chichibu had no children, as Princess Chichibu's only pregnancy ended in a miscarriage. However, by all accounts their marriage was filled with love and happiness for each other.

In 1937, the prince and princess were sent on a tour of Western Europe which took several months. They represented Japan at the May 1937 coronation of King George VI and Queen Elizabeth in Westminster Abbey and subsequently visited Sweden and the Netherlands as the guests of King Gustav V and Queen Wilhelmina, respectively. Princess Chichibu stayed in Switzerland while her husband met Adolf Hitler in Nuremberg at the end of the trip. Princess Chichibu felt a great love for the United States and for England and, as an anglophile, was greatly saddened by Japan's entry into the Second World War on the side of the Axis powers.

Widowhood
After the Prince's death of tuberculosis in 1953, Princess Chichibu became president of the Society for the Prevention of Tuberculosis, honorary president of the Britain-Japan Society, the Sweden-Japan Society, and an honorary vice president of the Japanese Red Cross The Princess made several semi-official visits to Great Britain and Sweden.

Death
Princess Chichibu died from heart failure in Tokyo on 25 August 1995, shortly before her 86th birthday. Princess Chichibu's autobiography, which was published posthumously as The Silver Drum: A Japanese Imperial Memoir, was translated into English by Dorothy Britton.

Decoration 

 Grand Cordon of the Order of the Precious Crown, 1st Class - 1928

Ancestry

Patrilineal descent

Setsuko's patriline is the line from which she is descended father to son.

The existence of a verifiable link between the Nitta clan and the Tokugawa/Matsudaira clan remains somewhat in dispute.

Descent prior to Keitai is unclear to modern historians, but traditionally traced back patrilineally to Emperor Jimmu
Emperor Keitai, ca. 450–534
Emperor Kinmei, 509–571
Emperor Bidatsu, 538–585
Prince Oshisaka, ca. 556–???
Emperor Jomei, 593–641
Emperor Tenji, 626–671
Prince Shiki, ????–716
Emperor Kōnin, 709–786
Emperor Kanmu, 737–806
Emperor Saga, 786–842
Emperor Ninmyō, 810–850
Emperor Montoku 826–858
Emperor Seiwa, 850–881
Prince Sadazumi, 873–916
Minamoto no Tsunemoto, 894–961
Minamoto no Mitsunaka, 912–997
Minamoto no Yorinobu, 968–1048
Minamoto no Yoriyoshi, 988–1075
Minamoto no Yoshiie, 1039–1106
Minamoto no Yoshikuni, 1091–1155
Minamoto no Yoshishige, 1114–1202
Nitta Yoshikane, 1139–1206
Nitta Yoshifusa, 1162–1195
Nitta Masayoshi, 1187–1257
Nitta Masauji, 1208–1271
Nitta Motouji, 1253–1324
Nitta Tomouji, 1274–1318
Nitta Yoshisada, 1301–1338
Nitta Yoshimune, 1331?–1368
Tokugawa Chikasue?, ????–???? (speculated)
Tokugawa Arichika, ????–????
Matsudaira Chikauji, d. 1393?
Matsudaira Yasuchika, ????–14??
Matsudaira Nobumitsu, c. 1404–1488/89?
Matsudaira Chikatada, 1430s–1501
Masudaira Nagachika, 1473–1544
Matsudaira Nobutada, 1490–1531
Matsudaira Kiyoyasu, 1511–1536
Matsudaira Hirotada, 1526–1549
Tokugawa Ieyasu, 1st Tokugawa Shōgun (1543–1616)
Tokugawa Yorifusa, 1st Lord of Mito (1603–1661)
Matsudaira Yorishige, 1st Lord of Takamatsu (1622–1695)
Matsudaira Yoriyuki (1661–1687)
Matsudaira Yoritoyo, 3rd Lord of Takamatsu (1680–1735)
Tokugawa Munetaka, 4th Lord of Mito (1705–1730)
Tokugawa Munemoto, 5th Lord of Mito (1728–1766)
Tokugawa Harumori, 6th Lord of Mito (1751–1805)
Matsudaira Yoshinari, 9th Lord of Takasu (1776–1832)
Matsudaira Yoshitatsu, 10th Lord of Takasu (1800–1862)
Matsudaira Katamori, 9th Lord of Aizu (1836–1893)
Tsuneo Matsudaira, (1877–1949)
Setsuko Matsudaira, (1909–1995)

Footnotes

References 
   Available only at the NDL and its partner libraries or to official registered users in Japan.
 
 
. "". p. 741 (plate number 0002.jp2)
. "Announcement by Naimushō #256 - Decorations and appointments (Shōkunkyoku) – as of 28 September Shōwa 3rd (1928) ; Princess Setsuko of Prince Chichibunomiya Yasuhito – Appointed to the Grand Cordon of the Order of the Precious Crown (1st class). " p.746 (plate number 0005.jp2)
 
 
 
 ** Tanaka "". pp.20-24 (plate number 0012.jp2-)

Further reading
  .
 Chichibunomiya Setsuko ; Shirasu, Masako  ; Asō, Kazuko . (April 1951). ". Fujin kōron vol. 37, no.4, pp56-65. Chūōkōron Shinsha, .
 
 Chichibunomiya Setsuko. (February 1976) "". Bungei shunjū,　vol. 54, issue 2, pp.p282-300, Bungeishunjū, .
  . Toshio Uyeno, 1987.  .
 . . Asahi Newspaper, 1995, "Asahi news shop series #031", .

 Princess Chichibu. The Silver Drum: A Japanese Imperial Memoir. Folkestone, Global Books Ltd.(distribution, UK) (May 1996). Trans. Dorothy Britton. 
 Prince and Princess Chichibu : two lives lived above and below the clouds. Rev. and expanded 2nd ed. Folkestone, Global Books Ltd.(distribution, UK) (2010). Trans. Britton, Dorothy. . Including a complete translation of Setsuko, Princess Chichibu's memoir The silver drum. Ema, Shuichi. Chichibu no Miya Hi Setsuko no shogai. Kaibushiki Kaisha Kuppon (1996).  (Japanese)
 Lebra, Sugiyama Takie. Above the Clouds: Status Culture of the Modern Japanese Nobility. University of California Press (1995). 
 Fujitani, T. Splendid Monarchy: Power and Pageantry in Modern Japan. University of California Press; Reprint edition (1998). 
  (May 2002). Rekishi dokuhon'', vol.47, no.5, pp.11-13,Shinjinbutsu Ōrai-sha, .

External links

Their Imperial Highnesses Prince and Princess Chichibu at the Imperial Household Agency website
"The Silver Drum"
"Floribunda Roses"

1909 births
1995 deaths
Japanese princesses
People from Walton-on-Thames
People from Tokyo
Sidwell Friends School alumni
Aizu-Matsudaira clan
Opposition to World War II
Anti–World War II activists

Grand Cordons (Imperial Family) of the Order of the Precious Crown

Honorary Dames Grand Cross of the Order of St Michael and St George
Honorary Dames Grand Cross of the Order of the British Empire
Princesses by marriage